Ny Kongensgade 3 is an 18th-century property located in the small Frederiksholm Quarter of central Copenhagen, Denmark. The building was listed on the Danish registry of protected buildings and places in 1986.

History

18th century

The site was in 1689 part of a larger property (then No. 294) owned by Christen Jensen. The property was the site of a six bays long one-storey building with a three-bay wall dormer. It was on 9 December 1848 sold in public auction for 1,501 rigsdaler to royal building master Jacob Fortling on behalf of Jacob Barchmann. Barchmann was the owner of the adjacent Barchmann Mansion at the corner of Ny Kongensgade and Frederiksholms Kanal in 1740–41.

The existing building were in 1757 replaced by a new four-storey building. The identity of the architect is not known but it is believed that it was designed by Philip de Lange who had also constructed Barchmann's first mansion at the site. It is assumed that the building was constructed as a rental property.

Barchmann's properties were on 11 March 1779 sold to Joahn & William Brown.

The jurist Christian Martfelt (1728-1790) resided in the building in the years 1774–1779.

Ny Kongensgade 3 and the Barchmann Mansion had the same owner until 1787. Ny Kongensgade 3 was in 1788 purchased by the historian Ove Malling

19th century
Matthias Holten. father of professor Carl Holten, purchased the building in 1812.

The building was from 1841 to 1853 owned by Albert Bartholin Hagen. He refurbished the building. The property was in 1877 acquired by merchant Gunni Busck, owner of Scandinavian Preserved Butter company, who that same year also founded Københavns Mælkeforsyning.  Busck  resided in the building with a housekeeper and a maid at the time of the 1880 census. The only other reisents were the concierge August Frederik Mansenm his wife Marie Christiane Mansen and their 11-year-old son.

Busck had already gas, plumbing and electricity installed in 1885.

20th century
The mansion was in 1917 sold to Henri Odewahn. He was the owner of the leading tea company C. J. Carøe. He refurbished the building with the assistance of the architect Bent Helweg-Møller to. Odewahn was also the owner of the country house Rågegården in Rågeleje.

References

External links

Listed residential buildings in Copenhagen
Residential buildings completed in 1757
1868 establishments in Denmark